Ñáñez is a surname. Notable people with the surname include:
Carlos José Ñáñez (born 1946), Argentine bishop
Freddy Ñáñez (born 1976), Venezuelan politician
Javier Náñez Pro (born 1991), Mexican politician
Lisa Náñez (born 1977), American footballler

Spanish-language surnames